Android Honeycomb is the codename for the third version of Android, designed for devices with larger screen sizes, particularly tablets, however has been unofficially ported to the Nexus One. It is the third major release of Android and is no longer supported. Honeycomb debuted with the Motorola Xoom in February 2011. Besides the addition of new features, Honeycomb introduced a new so-called "holographic" user interface theme and an interaction model that built on the main features of Android, such as multitasking, notifications and widgets.

Features

New features introduced in Honeycomb include the following:
 The Email and Contacts apps use a two-pane UI.
 The Gallery app now lets users view albums and other collections in full-screen mode, with access to thumbnails for other photos in a collection.
 The Browser app replaces browser windows with tabs, adds an incognito mode for anonymous browsing, and presents bookmarks and history in a unified view, among other features.
 A redesigned keyboard to make entering text easier on large-screen devices such as tablets.
 A Recent Apps view for multitasking.
 Customizable home screens (up to five).

See also
 Android version history
 iOS 4
 Mac OS X Snow Leopard
 Windows Phone 7
 Windows 7

References

External links 
 
 

Android (operating system)
2011 software